The Lithuanian Development Agency (LDA) was a non-profit organization owned by the Ministry of Economy of the Republic of Lithuania. It was the main national institution in charge of attracting foreign investments to Lithuania, increasing exports of Lithuanian goods and services, and developing the attractive economic image of the country abroad. The agency was founded in 1997. It employed more than 60 professionals and had two representative offices abroad. It was ranked as top 12 among 181 governmental agencies in providing accurate and speedy information to potential investors.

The Investment Promotion Department provided information on the investment opportunities, consulted regarding selection of investment partners and locations for business ventures. The International Trade Development Department provided information on Lithuanian products and manufacturers, organized trade missions and fairs. Public relations, advertising, and promotional events were handled by the Marketing Department. The Analysis Division provided tailored information to companies and governmental bodies. The agency helped such companies as Indorama (Thailand), Dematic (Germany), RGE (UK), Stiga Games (Sweden), Christie Tyler (UK), Marzotto (Italy).

In February 2010 the Lithuanian Development Agency was restructured into two public organizations – Invest Lithuania and Enterprise Lithuania.

According to the OECD, 2020 official development assistance from Lithuania decreased by 3.8% to US$67 million.

References

External links
www.lda.lt - official site in English
www.lepa.lt - official site in Lithuanian

Ministry of Economy (Lithuania)
Government agencies established in 1997
Government agencies disestablished in 2010
Non-profit organizations based in Lithuania